Jarno Karl Keimo Saarinen (11 December 1945 – 20 May 1973) was a Finnish professional Grand Prix motorcycle road racer. In the early 1970s, he was considered one of the most promising and talented motorcycle racers of his era until he was killed during the 1973 Nations Grand Prix in Italy. Saarinen's death led to increased demands for better safety conditions for motorcycle racers competing in the world championships. He remains the only Finn to have won a motorcycle road racing world championship. Saarinen was inducted into the F.I.M. MotoGP Hall of Fame in 2009.

Motorcycle racing career 
Jarno Saarinen was born and raised in Turku, South-West Finland. At the age of 15 he worked as apprentice and test-rider for Tunturi-Puch, motorcycle factory in Turku where mopeds and motorcycles were assembled under licence from the Austrian Puch manufacturer. Saarinen made his racing debut in an ice race at Ylone in 1961, finishing in second place. He and his close friend Teuvo Länsivuori participated in ice racing and grasstrack racing as well as road racing. 

In 1965 Saarinen won the 250cc Finnish ice racing national championship. Saarinen was also an accomplished motorcycle speedway racer. On 4 August 1968 he made his Grand Prix debut at Imatra, riding a 125cc Puch to an 11th place in the Finnish Grand Prix, in which he was lapped three times by world champions Phil Read and Bill Ivy. In 1969 he won the 125cc and 250cc Finnish motorcycle national championships while acting as his own mechanic.

Saarinen was noted for his riding style in which he kept his chest just above the motorcycle's fuel tank, and for the way he negotiated curves by shifting his body towards the inside of a turn while extending his knee out. His riding style influenced future world champion, Kenny Roberts, when he witnessed Saarinen during a race at the Ontario Motor Speedway in 1973. Saarinen rode at the Ontario Champion Sparkplugs Classic in 1972, aboard a privately entered ex-works Al Godin Yamaha 350cc. Saarinen was also noted for the peculiar style in which he angled his handlebars in an almost vertical position.

Saarinen competed in his first full year in the 1970 250cc championship while continuing to act as his own mechanic. He convinced three bank managers to fund his racing career under the mistaken belief that they were financing his education. He finished the season in fourth place despite missing the final three rounds of the championship to complete his education by graduating as an engineer from the Turku Technical Institute.

In 1971, Giacomo Agostini was the reigning three-time 350cc world champion riding for MV Agusta however, Saarinen served notice by winning his first 350cc Grand Prix race in Czechoslovakia after Agostini's motorcycle had a mechanical failure. He then finished second to Agostini in the Finnish Grand Prix before winning the Nations Grand Prix in Italy. Saarinen competed in both 250cc and 350cc classes in 1971, finishing third in 250cc World Championship and second to Agostini in the 350cc class. He also showed his versatility at the Spanish Grand Prix by finishing second in the 50cc race aboard a Kreidler then winning the 250cc race on a Yamaha.

Saarinen's success didn't go unnoticed as Yamaha contracted him to ride their 250cc and 350cc motorcycles for the 1972 season. The Yamaha factory gave him the second 250cc Yamaha TD-3 (YZ635) after Barry Sheene complained about its performance at the third round in Austria. Saarinen rewarded Yamaha's faith in him by winning the 250cc World Championship in a tight  season-long battle with Renzo Pasolini and Rod Gould. He finished second in 350cc World Championship, giving defending champion Giacomo Agostini a strong challenge by winning three races, including a victory at the German Grand Prix held at the daunting Nürburgring race track, where Saarinen defeated Agostini for the first time in a head-to-head race. He also scored a double victory at the Czechoslovakian Grand Prix with victories in both the 250cc and 350cc classes. The threat from Saarinen's performance was so strong that the previously dominant MV Agusta factory was forced to produce a new 350cc motorcycle for Agostini. After the world championship season ended, Saarinen traveled to Great Britain where he won the Race of the Year invitational held at Mallory Park.

At the end of the season, Saarinen negotiated with the Benelli factory about the possibility of riding 350cc and 500cc Benellis in the world championships. After a secret test ride at Modena, he rode Benellis to victories over Agostini in the 350cc and 500cc races at the Pesaro street circuit. The Yamaha factory reacted to the possibility of losing their star rider by signing Saarinen to a factory-backed sponsorship to compete on the newly developed YZR500 for the 1973 season. He would also defend his 250cc world championship for the Yamaha factory. The factory sponsorship also meant that he was provided with mechanics for his motorcycles, freeing him to concentrate on racing. With Saarinen signed to a contract, Yamaha was finally ready to challenge MV Agusta's sixteen-year reign in the 500cc class with competitive equipment.

Saarinen's 1973 season started well, as he became the first European rider to win the prestigious Daytona 200 race in the United States on a Yamaha TZ 350 against much larger 750cc capacity opposition. At the time, the Daytona 200 was considered one of the most prestigious motorcycle races in the world. He returned to Europe where, against an impressive field of competitors, he claimed a victory at the prestigious Imola 200 round of the inaugural Formula 750 European championship in 1973, once again defeating competitors on larger motorcycles with the TZ 350.

Saarinen jumped to an early lead in the 1973 world championships by scoring a double victory at the season-opening French Grand Prix. He won the 250cc race then beat Read by 16 seconds to win the 500cc race. He followed this with another double victory at the Austrian Grand Prix held at the fast Salzburgring circuit. He continued his winning streak by winning the 250cc German Grand Prix but, then failed to finish the 500cc race when his chain broke while challenging Read for the lead.

Death
After sitting out the 1973 Isle of Man TT which most of the top racers boycotted due to safety concerns, Saarinen arrived at the Nations Grand Prix leading both the 250cc and 500cc championships. The Monza Circuit, first opened in 1922, was fast and lined with steel barriers which left no room for error for motorcycle racers. The steel guardrails lining the circuit were installed as a result of demands by automobile racers following an accident which occurred during the 1961 Italian Grand Prix when racing driver Wolfgang von Trips and 15 spectators were killed. Most auto racers believed steel barriers would improve safety for auto racers and spectators, but they had the opposite effect for motorcyclists. When he arrived at Monza, Saarinen had complained about the guardrails, but no action was taken. Despite the installation of two new chicanes for cars during the previous year's Formula One season (placed before the Curva Grande and at Vialone) they were not used for motorcycle racing at Monza.

On the first lap of the 250cc race, tragedy struck when the second-placed rider, Renzo Pasolini's motorcycle lurched sideways and crashed into the guardrail, killing him instantly. Pasolini's motorcycle then bounced back onto the circuit and struck Saarinen on his head. The impact knocked off his helmet and he sustained fatal head injuries. The collision caused a chain reaction accident in which more than 14 riders were involved including; Hideo Kanaya, Walter Villa, Victor Palomo, Fosco Giansanti, Börje Jansson and Chas Mortimer with several of them suffering serious injuries. The race was stopped and the following 500cc race was cancelled in the aftermath of the accident.

Over the years, the cause of the accident was the subject to significant controversy. The original cause of the crash was attributed to a spill left on the track during the 350cc race when Walter Villa's Benelli began smoking and leaking oil on the penultimate lap. Race officials failed to remove the spillage prior to the 250cc race, and one rider, John Dodds, made his concerns known to authorities, only to meet with threats of ejection from the circuit by police. However, some articles have appeared showing photos of Pasolini's bike consistent with engine seizure, locking the rear wheel and causing the crash. Further the official inquiry into the accident, issued in September 1973 found that the cause of the accident was the seizure of the engine in the motorcycle of Renzo Pasolini.

Legacy
The tragedy at Monza was a shock to the motorcycle racing community. Two of the sports best riders had been lost and the factory racing teams of Suzuki, MV Agusta, Harley Davidson, and Yamaha joined together to demand safer conditions at race tracks. Only forty days later, three riders in an Italian Juniors race were killed in the same turn. One month after the Nations Grand Prix, race teams took a stand and boycotted the Yugoslavian Grand Prix held at the treacherous Opatija Circuit due to dangerous track conditions. The Yamaha factory went further by withdrawing from racing for the rest of the year to honor Saarinen's memory.  

The death of Gilberto Parlotti at the 1972 Isle of Man TT and the deaths of Saarinen and Pasolini in 1973 highlighted the need for improved safety standards for motorcycle racers. At the time, many motorcycle Grand Prix races were still being held on street circuits with hazards such as telephone poles and railroad crossings. Dedicated race tracks of the time were also dangerous for motorcycle racers due to the steel trackside barriers preferred by car racers. Tensions over safety issues continued to simmer throughout the 1970s between the Grand Prix racers, race organizers and the FIM, as riders showed their increasing dissatisfaction with the safety standards and the way races were organized by boycotting several Grand Prix races.

The situation reached a breaking point in 1979 when, the reigning 500cc world champion Kenny Roberts and journalist Barry Coleman attempted to break the FIM hegemony by organizing many of the top racers to begin the process of establishing a rival motorcycle championship called the World Series. Although the competing series failed to take off due to difficulties in securing enough venues, it forced the FIM to take the riders' demands seriously and make changes regarding their safety. During the 1979 FIM Congress, new rules were passed increasing prize money substantially and in subsequent years, stricter safety regulations were imposed on race organizers. In the following years, dangerous racing circuits were removed from the Grand Prix schedule. Race circuits began replacing the steel guardrails that lined the tracks and creating safe run-off areas. This would mark the beginning of an era of increased professionalism and improving safety standards in the sport. The current MotoGP and World Superbike championships are held at closed-course circuits. Monza has three slow chicanes on the circuit, but is not present on either calendar. Fatal crashes have still occurred in the 21st century, but at a much reduced rate compared to TT racing.

The Ruissalo People's Park in Turku has a road named after Saarinen. The street in front of the Italian motorcycle manufacturer Benelli's factory in Pesaro is named Via Jarno Saarinen. The name Jarno became very popular in Italy in the 1970s, one well-known bearer being former Formula-1 driver Jarno Trulli. In 2009, the F.I.M. inducted Saarinen into the MotoGP Hall of Fame. There is still an active Saarinen fan club in Italy, and on 7 June 2014 the fan club promoted the opening of Jarno Saarinen Park in Petrignano, Assisi, Italy. In August 2016, a bronze statue of Saarinen was unveiled in the park, and in July 2017, a duplicate of the statue was also revealed at Turku's Aurajoki Beach in Barker Park. Saarinen remains the only Finn to have won a motorcycle road racing world championship, winning 15 Grands Prix during his career. Saarinen was also a six time Finnish road racing national champion.

Motorcycle Grand Prix results

(key) (Races in bold indicate pole position; races in italics indicate fastest lap)

References

External links 

 Saarinen fan site 

Finnish motorcycle racers
50cc World Championship riders
125cc World Championship riders
250cc World Championship riders
350cc World Championship riders
500cc World Championship riders
Sportspeople from Turku
Motorcycle racers who died while racing
1945 births
1973 deaths
Sport deaths in Italy
250cc World Riders' Champions